Kentucky Route 2706 (KY 2706) is a  state highway in Bullitt in the U.S. State of Kentucky. Its western terminus is at KY 44 in Mount Washington and its eastern terminus is at U.S. Route 31EX (US 31EX) in Mount Washington.

Major junctions

References

2706
2706